Ikersuaq, old spelling Ikerssuak, is a fjord in southwestern Greenland. Administratively it is part of the Kujalleq municipality.

Geography
The Ikersuaq fjord is oriented in a roughly NE/SW direction and to the southwest its mouth opens into the Julianehab Bay, Labrador Sea, North Atlantic Ocean. There is a vast ice field on the northwestern side of the fjord, where there are three branches, Qaleragdlit Imâ, Kangerlua and Kangerluarsuk.  

The Northern Sermilik (Nordre Sermilik) fjord is the inner section of Ikersuaq fjord. On its southern side the 1,440 m high Ilimaussaq peak rises in the peninsula to the east of the fjord. Northern Sermilik has two branches in the north with large glaciers at their heads. 

Elongated Tuttutooq Island is a prolongation of the southwestern end of the peninsula forming the southern shore of Northern Sermilik. The Narsaq Sound separates the peninsula from the island on the southern shore, connecting with neighbouring Tunulliarfik and Skovfjord.

Bibliography
Ivar Haug (2005). Gazetteer of Greenland UBiT (Trondheim University Library),

See also
List of fjords of Greenland

References

External links
The Magmatic and Fluid Evolution of the Motzfeldt Intrusion in South Greenland: Insights into the Formation of Agpaitic and Miaskitic Rocks
 Eqalorutsit glacier entering the northern end of the Nordre Sermilik fjord in southwest Greenland
 Holocene relative sea-level changes in the inner Bredefjord area, southern Greenland
Fjords of Greenland